Charmaine Elizabeth Hooper (born January 15, 1968) is a Canadian retired soccer player. A four-time winner of the Canadian Players of the Year award and member of the Canada Soccer Hall of Fame, Hooper played on the Canada women's national soccer team from 1986 to 2006. As a forward, she stood as Canada's record holder for the women's national team for appearances and goals scored when she retired. Hooper competed in three FIFA Women's World Cup tournaments: 1995 in Sweden, 1999, and 2003 in the United States. At club level, Hooper played professionally in Norway, Italy, Japan, and the United States.

Early life 
Hooper was born on January 15, 1968, in Georgetown, Guyana. She and her family moved to Zambia when Hooper was 6 years old, then later to Ottawa when she was 9. She attended J. S. Woodsworth Secondary School, then later North Carolina State University.

While at NCSU, Hooper was a student-athlete on the NC State Wolfpack women's soccer team. She set the record for most points in a season, most goals in a season, most points in a career, and most goals in a career. The team was Atlantic Coast Conference champions in 1988, made it to the NCAA quarterfinals in 1987 and 1990, the semifinals in 1989, and the final in 1988. She made 89 appearances and scored 58 goals for the Wolfpack and graduated with a degree in food science. Following her career, she was inducted into the NC State Athletic Hall of Fame in 2014.

Club career 
In 1993, Hooper played for FK Donn of the Norwegian Toppserien. She scored 17 goals in 13 league appearances. After a short period with Lazio of Serie A, Hooper signed a professional contract with Japanese L. League club Prima Ham FC Kunoichi.  She was a highly valued player in Japan and returned to North America after four seasons: "There was nothing more to gain in Japan.  I had won just about every award there. Plus there was the distance."

She returned to the United States and played for the Rockford Dactyls and the Chicago Cobras of the USL W-League. She would be inducted into the inaugural class of the United Soccer League's Hall of Fame in 2002.

When the Women's United Soccer Association (WUSA) professional league was being put together in America, Hooper signed a letter of intent but had concerns over the salary structure.  Hooper was selected by the Atlanta Beat in the 2000 WUSA Foreign Player Allocation and played for the team for all three seasons of the WUSA's existence, including the championship matches in 2001 and 2003.

She returned to the W-League Cobras in 2004, then played in the same league for the New Jersey Wildcats in 2006. In 2008, she played for the Fort Worth FC of the Women's Premier Soccer League (WPSL), her final season of club competition.

International career 

Hooper made 128 appearances and scored 71 goals for Canada, at one time both national records. Her international debut came on July 7, 1986 against the United States. She represented Canada at three FIFA Women's World Cups (Sweden 1995, USA 1999 and USA 2003).

In August 2006 Hooper and Christine Latham refused to attend two exhibition games against China and fell into dispute with team coach Even Pellerud. Along with a third disgruntled player, Sharolta Nonen, they publicly called for Pellerud's removal. Alleging he had pressured them to break their club contracts in order to join Vancouver Whitecaps and had tried to fix the outcome of a USL W-League play-off by releasing certain national team players but not others. Pellerud suspended the players and terminated their funding. In June 2007 an arbitrator ruled in favor of the coach. Hooper's replacement as captain Christine Sinclair strongly criticized the players' actions: "They let down their teammates and since then have done nothing to rectify it. I wouldn't want them as teammates."

Hooper was inducted into the Canadian Soccer Hall of Fame in June 2012. The same year in October she was inducted into Canada's Sports Hall of Fame in Calgary.

Personal 
She is the sister of Lyndon Hooper, also a former Canadian footballer, and Ian Hooper, the Director of Business Operations for the Ottawa Champions Baseball Club. She is from Nepean, Ontario.  She is married to Chuck Codd, a University soccer coach. They have a daughter.

In 2014, she and her husband were featured on the show Fixer Upper as they selected and renovated their home, which ultimately became a baby care center.

Career statistics

Club 
These statistics are incomplete and currently represent a portion of Hooper's career.

References

External links 
 
 / Canada Soccer Hall of Fame
 Player profile at Women's United Soccer Association
 Player profile at New Jersey Wildcats

1968 births
Living people
Black Canadian women's soccer players
Expatriate women's footballers in Norway
Canadian women's soccer players
Canada women's international soccer players
1995 FIFA Women's World Cup players
1999 FIFA Women's World Cup players
2003 FIFA Women's World Cup players
Expatriate footballers in Japan
Guyanese emigrants to Canada
Afro-Guyanese people
Canadian expatriate sportspeople in Italy
Canadian expatriate sportspeople in Japan
Canadian expatriate sportspeople in Norway
Canadian expatriate sportspeople in the United States
Naturalized citizens of Canada
NC State Wolfpack women's soccer players
Sportspeople from Georgetown, Guyana
Soccer players from Ottawa
Women's United Soccer Association players
Atlanta Beat (WUSA) players
FIFA Century Club
S.S. Lazio Women 2015 players
Serie A (women's football) players
Toppserien players
Expatriate women's footballers in Italy
FK Donn players
Expatriate women's soccer players in the United States
Expatriate women's footballers in Japan
Iga FC Kunoichi players
Nadeshiko League players
Women's association football forwards
Nadeshiko League MVPs
Chicago Cobras players
USL W-League (1995–2015) players